Derevnishchi is a rural locality (a village) in Lyakhovskoye Rural Settlement, Melenkovsky District, Vladimir Oblast, Russia. The population was 41 as of 2010.

Geography 
Derevnishchi is located 16 km northeast of Melenki (the district's administrative centre) by road. Savkovo is the nearest rural locality.

References 

Rural localities in Melenkovsky District